Temptations of a Shop Girl is a lost 1927 silent crime drama directed by Tom Terriss, with Betty Compson and Pauline Garon leading the cast. B-movie studio Chadwick Pictures was the production company.

Cast
Betty Compson – Ruth Harrington
Pauline Garon – Betty Harrington
Armand Kaliz – Andre Le Croix
Bob Custer – Jerry Horton (*as Raymond Glenn)
William Humphrey – John Horton (*as William Humphreys)
Cora Williams – Mrs. Harrington
Gladden James – Bud Conway
John Francis Dillon – Jim Butler

References

External links
 Temptations of a Shop Girl at IMDb.com

1927 films
American silent feature films
Lost American films
Films directed by Tom Terriss
1927 crime drama films
American black-and-white films
American crime drama films
1927 lost films
1920s American films
Silent American drama films